Qaraqoyunlu or Karakoyunly may refer to:
Kara Koyunlu, Turkoman tribal confederation that ruled Azerbaijan, Armenia, and Iraq in A.D 14-15th centuries
Qaraqoyunlu, Agsu, Azerbaijan
Qaraqoyunlu, Barda, Azerbaijan
Qaraqoyunlu, Goranboy, Azerbaijan
Qaraqoyunlu, Qubadli, Azerbaijan
Qaraqoyunlu, Shamkir, Azerbaijan